Mocis cubana  is a moth of the family Erebidae. It is found in Cuba and was first reported from the Florida Keys by John B. Heppner in 2003.

References

External links
Images

Moths described in 1913
cubana